The list of teams and cyclists in the 2006 Vuelta a España contains the professional road bicycle racers who competed at the 2006 Vuelta a España from August 26 to September 17, 2006.

See also
2006 Vuelta a España

References

2006 Vuelta a España
2006